Josephine Myrtle Corbin (May 12, 1868 – May 6, 1928) was an American sideshow performer born as a dipygus. This referred to the fact that she had two separate pelvises side by side from the waist down, as a result of her body axis splitting as it developed. Each of her smaller inner legs was paired with one of her outer legs. She was said to be able to move her inner legs, but they were too weak for walking.

Early life and family
Corbin was born in Lincoln County, Tennessee. Corbin's parents were William H. Corbin, aged 25 at the time of his daughter's birth, and Nancy Corbin (née Sullins), aged 34. Both parents were described by physicians who examined the infant shortly after her birth as being very similar in appearance, "both having auburn hair, blue eyes, and very fair complexion"; in fact, they looked so similar that the physicians felt compelled to point out that they were not "blood kin". The Corbins had four children in total, including a child from Nancy's first marriage.

Myrtle's birth was not marked by anything "peculiar about the labour or delivery" according to her mother. Doctors who examined the child shortly after her birth noted that a breech presentation "would have proved fatal to the infant, and possibly to the mother." Corbin soon showed herself to be a strong child, weighing  three weeks after the birth, and it was reported in a journal published later that year that she "nurses healthily" and was "thriving well".

Career
Corbin entered the sideshow circuit with the moniker "Four-Legged Girl from Texas" when she was 13 years old; one of her first promotional pamphlets described her as being as "gentle of disposition as the summer sunshine and as happy as the day is long." Her popularity in this industry was such that other showmen turned to exhibiting four-legged gaffs (falsified performances). When Corbin herself was no longer performing, there were several phony four-legged women to whom audiences could turn.

Presence in medical literature
Teratologists in medical journals and encyclopedias  in the 19th century classified Corbin's anomaly using several different, yet equally complex, terms, according to conventions of the time. Some referred to her as a "dipygus dibrachius tetrapus", others named her condition posterior dichotomy,' subvariety schizorachis". One doctor, Brooks H. Wells, described her as "female, belonging to the monocephalic, ileadelphic class of monsters by fusion."

Personal life
At age 19 she married James Clinton Bicknell, with whom she had four daughters and a son.

In the spring of 1887 approximately a year after marrying Bicknell, Corbin became pregnant for the first time: her condition was discovered by Dr. Lewis Whaley, of Blountsville, Alabama, who was sent for after Corbin had experienced pain in her left side, fever, headache, and a decreased appetite. In addition, the physician noted that "vomiting and amenorrhoea had persisted for two months". Whaley wrote up the case for the Atlanta Medical and Surgical Journal, which led to a resurgence of interest in Myrtle throughout the late 1880s, now known in medical journals as 'Mrs. B.'

Examining Corbin, Whaley discovered that the duplication of her external sexual organs was mirrored by a similar duplication internally. He determined that it was in her left uterus that Mrs. B. was pregnant. According to Whaley, upon being told that she was pregnant, she replied in disbelief, saying "If it had been in my right side I would come nearer believing you are correct." From this comment, physicians determined that Corbin preferred intercourse in the right side, and this fact was commented upon in several subsequent reports.
The pregnancy caused Corbin to become gravely ill, and after consulting with colleagues, Whaley decided to perform an abortion eight weeks after her initial examination. She was, reportedly, between three and four months pregnant at the time. She made a full recovery, and the procedure (as well as her unique anatomy), did not prevent her from successfully carrying subsequent pregnancies to term. As medical journals across the United States and around the world turned renewed attention to a now mature Corbin, details about her personality revealed a sense of the woman: One article noted that "The lady, Mrs. B.... the Myrtle Corbin of days gone by, [is] attractive in face, physically well, and able to attend to all her household duties", while she was described elsewhere as being "very intelligent" and "a refined woman, of some musical taste."

Death
She died in Cleburne, Texas, on May 6, 1928. Her casket was covered in concrete and various family members kept watch until it was fully cured. This was to prevent grave robbers from stealing her corpse. Several medical practitioners and private collectors offered financial compensation for her corpse.

Gallery

Cultural references
 In 2015 Graywolf Press published Four-Legged Girl by Diane Seuss. The 88 page collection of poems was a finalist for the 2016 Pulitzer Prize for Poetry.

References

External links

 Article about Myrtle Corbin on Sideshow World
 

1868 births
1928 deaths
American people with disabilities
Sideshow performers
People with supernumerary body parts
People from Lincoln County, Tennessee
People from Blount County, Alabama
People from Cleburne, Texas